Richard L. Jantz Stadium  (formerly "Sonner Stadium") is a sport stadium in Winfield, Kansas, United States.  The facility is primarily used by the Southwestern College Moundbuilders football and track & field teams.  The grass field is named "Art Kahler Field" from prominent Southwestern alum Art Kahler and the surrounding track is named "Monypenny Track" in honor of alum William Monypenny.

Sunflower Bowl
The facility hosted the Sunflower Bowl during the bowl's entire operation, from 1982 to 1986.  The stadium is also used for local high school sporting events and other community events.

Rebuilding
In January 2009, the school announced plans for a major renovation, including changing the name from "Sonner Stadium" to "Richard L. Jantz Stadium".  The renovations are expected to attract better student-athletes and bigger events to Winfield.  The final Southwestern football game was played before the renovations on November 7, 2009, with a victory over Tabor.

References

External links
 Visual Tour of Sonner Stadium

College football venues
Sports venues in Kansas
Buildings and structures in Cowley County, Kansas
American football venues in Kansas